Dale Coyne Racing (DCR) is an American professional open-wheel racing team that currently competes in the IndyCar Series. The team was founded in 1984 and is owned by former driver Dale Coyne. From 1995 to 2000, the team was known as Payton-Coyne Racing, reflecting a partnership with Chicago Bears great Walter Payton. After the 1988 season, Coyne stepped out of the cockpit and turned his talents to the tutelage of several up-and-coming drivers. Once known for competing on budgets far smaller than most of their competitors, the team earned its maiden victory after 25 years at Watkins Glen International in July 2009 with Justin Wilson.

Coyne's No. 51 entry is entered in partnership with Rick Ware Racing, with Takuma Sato driving.

CART / Champ Car World Series

Dale Coyne raced smaller open-cockpit cars during the late-1970s and early-1980s before pursuing a career in the fledgling CART series. He attempted to qualify, with limited success, for each CART race in 1984, but his efforts earned him a CART franchise for the following season. In 1986, the team raced the Coyne DC-1, which was a 1984 Lola Indy car modified to fit a Chevrolet stock-block engine. The team reverted to a customer March chassis for the next season, with Coyne doing all of the driving. Due to budget constraints, the team utilized one of the only stock-block Chevrolet engines in the field. After utilizing the 1986 Rookie of the Year Dominic Dobson for one race in 1988 with little improvement in performance, Coyne realized that the team could not improve without better equipment. In 1989, the team upgraded to a pair of 1988 Lola-Cosworth cars for Italian pay drivers Guido Dacco and Fulvio Ballabio.

The end of 1988 saw Coyne's retirement as a driver to concentrate on tutoring newer, younger drivers, although he contested several more races as a driver through 1991. In 1990, the team fielded a new Lola car for Dean Hall, thanks to full-time sponsorship from the Japanese [insight] group. The chief mechanic, Bernie Myers, ensured a well-prepared car that earned the team its first start at the Indy 500 and scored 4 points during the season. The team's mechanical expertise was recognized as both Coyne and Myers would be awarded the Clint Brawner Mechanical Excellence Award at the 1990 and 1992 Indy 500 races, respectively.

For much of the team's subsequent years, it has utilized pay drivers, who finance their racing with Coyne with either personal funds or self-obtained sponsorship. Often, the team ran one driver for a full season, with a second car being prepared for a rotation of drivers with only a partial season of financing. However, Coyne earned a reputation for quickly developing the skills of these drivers to a point where they could advance their careers. Drivers of note who had their first CART ride with Coyne included eventual series champion Paul Tracy, the Indy Lights champion Éric Bachelart, and eventual Le Mans winner André Lotterer.

Despite the lack of competitive results during its first two decades of operation, the team was nevertheless a consistent full-time entrant year after year. Ex-Formula 1 driver Roberto Moreno, starting his second stint in CART racing in 1996, broke through with the team's first podium finish at the 1996 U.S. 500.

Michel Jourdain Jr. took over driving duties for the team and earned STP Most Improved Driver honors from his peers, in 1997. Jourdain would continue with the team through the 1999 season. Meanwhile, the second car was provided to various drivers with few competitive results.

In 2000, Tarso Marques led the team with 17 starts following a deal with Swift Engineering for the team to field a factory-supported Swift chassis. He was joined by Takuya Kurosawa, who drove 8 starts, including an inspired drive at Long Beach which saw Kurosawa becoming the first Japanese driver to lead a CART race before an accident ended his hopes of a Top 10 finish. Alex Barron and Gualter Salles also shared the second car. Marques and Barron both recorded career-best finishes when the season closed. Barron, in particular, ran as high as second place in Australia before suffering an engine failure, and was in contention at Fontana, where he led the race for several laps and was in contention for victory before again retiring with an engine failure.

The team struggled to stay afloat in 2001, following a short-lived partnership with the Project Racing Group that only enabled the team to contest two races. Coyne reemerged the following year to field the one-off Team St. George entry with driver Darren Manning, which resulted in a competitive run to 9th place at the 2002 Rockingham 500. Later in the season, Coyne provided Andre Lotterer with his only Champ Car start in Mexico.

The Coyne team returned to full-time competition in 2003, fielding six drivers with a top result of 6th place by the veteran Salles, although the other drivers were seldom competitive.

The 2004 Champ Car season was an improved season with new sponsors American Medical Response and Yoke TV. The 19 & 11 entries were piloted by Oriol Servià and Gastón Mazzacane. Servià had Dale Coyne Racing's best season ever by placing third at Mazda Raceway Laguna Seca and finishing 10th in the final standings.

In 2007, driver Bruno Junqueira recorded back-to-back-to-back podium finishes – Zolder, Belgium, Assen, Netherlands and Surfers Paradise, Australia –en route to a seventh-place finish for the year.

IndyCar Series

In 2008, the team's first year in the IndyCar Series, drivers Bruno Junqueira and Mario Moraes recorded five combined top-10 finishes and both drivers led several laps during the famed Indianapolis 500.

In the first race of the 2009 season, the Honda Grand Prix of St. Petersburg, driver Justin Wilson finished third, which was the first IRL podium finish for Dale Coyne Racing. On July 5, 2009, Wilson earned Dale Coyne Racing their first win by winning the Camping World Grand Prix at the Glen, at Watkins Glen International. The British driver dominated the race, leading 49 of the 60 laps. It was Coyne's 558th career start as an owner or as a driver.

On January 11 the team announced that Boy Scouts of America would be the primary sponsor of the number 19 car for 2010. He also stated that Z Line will likely return to sponsor the number 18 car and that drivers would be announced at a later date. However, on February 4, it was announced that Z Line would follow Justin Wilson to Dreyer & Reinbold Racing. On March 4, DCR announced Milka Duno would drive the number 18 Citgo car for the entire season. Duno's season brought her the best finish of 19th, though she failed to qualify for the Indy 500 and ended up 23rd in points while British driver Alex Lloyd in the #19 car won Rookie of the Year, finishing 16th in points with a best finish of fourth in the 2010 Indianapolis 500. Duno moved over to ARCA following the season. British rookie James Jakes stepped into the #18 car for 2011 and four-time Champ Car champion Sébastien Bourdais was signed to drive the #19 respectively for road course races only due to conflicts with the Le Mans Series, where he also competed. Alex Lloyd was returned to the team to drive in the oval races. Lloyd qualified for the 2011 Indianapolis 500 and finished 19th but Jakes failed to make the field.

On January 25, 2012, Honda and its Honda Performance Development (HPD) announced it would power a two-car effort for Dale Coyne Racing in the 2012 IZOD IndyCar Series with their all-new 2.2-liter turbocharged V6 IndyCar engine.  Justin Wilson also returned to the team for the 2012 season.  In addition to the signing of both Honda and Wilson, the team has also re-signed renowned engineer Bill Pappas, "putting the band back together" of the team that combined to score Dale Coyne Racing's first win in IndyCar racing, at Watkins Glen in 2009.

The team scored its second win and first-ever oval win with Justin Wilson at Texas Motor Speedway in 2012 and captured another win in 2013 with Mike Conway in his first start for the team in Detroit Belle Isle Grand Prix race 1. In that race Justin Wilson finished third, putting two Coyne cars on the podium for the first time. Ana Beatriz had driven Conway's car for the first five races of the season.

For 2014, Wilson would remain in the No. 19 while Formula Renault 3.5 driver Carlos Huertas would take over the No. 18 for the season. Huertas would score his first career win at the first round of the Grand Prix of Houston.

In 2015, Carlos Huertas made his return to the No. 18 car and rookie Francesco Dracone drove the No. 19 in the first few races of the season. In May 2015, it was announced that Huertas had an ear problem and could not continue racing for the season. It was also announced that Dracone was released from the team. Pippa Mann then drove the rest of the oval races for the season in the No. 18 car and Rodolfo González drove the rest of the road courses for the remainder of the season in that car. After Francesco Dracone's release from the No. 19, James Davison drove the car in the Indianapolis 500 and 2013 rookie Tristan Vautier drove the No. 19 for the remainder of the season.

In 2016, rookie Conor Daly drove the No. 18 car sponsored by Johnathon Byrd's Group for the entirety of the 2016 season. He finished the year 18th in the standings. The No. 19 entry had three drivers that shared seat time, which included Luca Filippi, RC Enerson, Pippa Mann, and Gabby Chaves. Gabby Chaves drove for the team in the 100th Indianapolis 500 while RC Enerson had two very impressive appearances at Mid-Ohio and Watkins Glen.

For 2017, it was announced that Sébastien Bourdais would drive the No. 18 car, to be joined by engineers Craig Hampson, who he won his 4 Champ Car titles with at Newman-Haas Racing and Olivier Boisson, who he won races with at KVSH Racing. In addition, 2016 Indy Lights champion Ed Jones would drive the No. 19 car. The team had early success to start the season with Bourdais winning at St. Petersburg and finishing second at Long Beach and holding an early season points lead, while Jones was 7th in points after two races after back-to-back top-ten finishes. After a moderately successful race at Barber Motorsports Park, however, Bourdais' fortunes began to turn sour, as early retirements plagued the No. 18 both at Phoenix and the Indianapolis road course. Bourdais' season then came to a sudden end during qualifying for the Indy 500, where a severe accident left him with multiple pelvic fractures and a fractured hip. James Davison was hired as a last-minute replacement for the 500. Ex-F1 driver Esteban Gutiérrez was then signed to drive the car until Bourdais' return (at Gateway after a rapid recovery), except for the Texas round where Tristan Vautier returned to the team. Jones would go on to win Rookie of the Year honors on the strength of his 3rd place finish at the Indy 500 but would depart for Chip Ganassi Racing at the end of the year.

In February 2018, former KVSH co-owners Jimmy Vasser and James "Sulli" Sullivan formed a partnership with Dale Coyne to field Sébastien Bourdais for the 2018 IndyCar Series as Dale Coyne Racing with Vasser-Sullivan. Replacing Jones in the No. 19 would be Indy Lights driver Zachary Claman DeMelo and 2017 Formula V8 3.5 champion Pietro Fittipaldi, grandson of Emerson Fittipaldi. However, Fittipaldi would be injured during qualifying for the World Endurance Championship 6 Hours of Spa-Francorchamps, requiring De Melo to replace him for May and Texas, while Haas F1 Team development driver Santino Ferrucci would debut at the Detroit Grand Prix (IndyCar) and finished 22nd and 20th. Fittipaldi returned at Mid Ohio in the No. 19 car due to be joined by Ferrucci for the final two races of the season in a third car sponsored by Cly-Del running the number 39.

Sebastien Bourdais will continue driving in the No. 18 car with a continuation of the Vasser-Sullivan partnership which had also been extended for multiple years. Bourdais' current best finish is a podium achieved at Barber Motorsports Park. Santino Ferrucci would return to the team for the full season in 2019 running as the only driver in a David Yurman sponsored No. 19 car. His best finish of the season came at the opening race of 9th with another Top 10 at the IndyCar Grand Prix. James Davison will join the team for the 2019 Indianapolis 500 in a partnership with Jonathan Byrd's Racing, Hollinger MotorSport, and Belardi Auto Racing in a continuation of the partnership from last year but changing from A.J. Foyt Racing continuing to use the No. 33.

In December 2021, the team announced they would be signing Takuma Sato to race full-time for the 2022 season in the No. 51 car, replacing the outgoing Romain Grosjean. Also, they would partner with HMD Motorsports in the #18 for David Malukas.

Chicagoland Speedway
In 1998, Coyne designed and built Route 66 Raceway in Joliet, Illinois. This state-of-the-art drag racing facility drew the attention of Indianapolis Motor Speedway CEO Tony George. George and Coyne, along with International Speedway Corporation, would go on to expand the facility by forming a partnership and building Chicagoland Speedway.  Coyne served as president of the facility through its construction and opening season and along with George, served on its management committee until its eventual buyout by ISC in 2007.

Racing results

Complete CART / CCWS results
(key)

Complete IndyCar Series results
(key)

* Season still in progress

 Races run on same day, Long Beach to Champ Car specifications.
 Non-points-paying, exhibition race.
 The final race at Las Vegas was canceled due to Dan Wheldon's death.
 "dba Thom Burns Racing".
 In conjunction with Vasser Sullivan Racing.
 In conjunction with Byrd-Hollinger-Belardi.
 In conjunction with Rick Ware Racing.
 In conjunction with HMD Motorsports.

IndyCar wins

Past and present drivers

 Éric Bachelart (1992–1993, 1995)
 Mauro Baldi (1994)
 Fulvio Ballabio (1989–1990)
 Alex Barron (2000)
 Ana Beatriz (2013)
 Townsend Bell (2001)
 Ross Bentley (1991–1995)
 Tony Bettenhausen Jr. (1989)
 Tom Bigelow (1984)
 Brian Bonner (1992–1993)
 Geoff Boss (2003)
 Sébastien Bourdais (2011, 2017–present)
 Ronnie Bremer (2005)
 Robbie Buhl (1993–1994)
 Juan Cáceres (2006)
 Joël Camathias (2003)
 Gabby Chaves (2016)
 Mike Conway (2013)
 Dale Coyne (1984–1989, 1991)
 Guido Daccò (1989)
 Conor Daly (2015-2016)
 Ryan Dalziel (2005)
 Cristiano da Matta (2006)
 Christian Danner (1997)
 James Davison (2013, 2015, 2017, 2019)
 Zachary Claman DeMelo (2018)
 Dominic Dobson (1988)
 Mario Domínguez (2006)
 Francesco Dracone (2015)
 Milka Duno (2010)
 RC Enerson (2016)
 Cornelius Euser (1991)
 Santino Ferrucci (2018–2020)
 Luca Filippi (2016)
 Pietro Fittipaldi (2018)
 Franck Fréon (1995)
 Luiz Garcia Jr. (1999, 2001)
 Memo Gidley (1999)
 Roberto González (2003)
 Rodolfo González (2015)
 Michael Greenfield (1991)
 Romain Grosjean (2021)
 Esteban Gutiérrez (2017)
 Dean Hall (1990)
 Scott Harrington (1989)
 Jan Heylen (2006)
 Carlos Huertas (2014–2015)
 James Jakes (2011)
 Jaroslav Janiš (2004)
 Paul Jasper (1997)
 Ken Johnson (1989)
 Ed Jones (2017)
 Michel Jourdain Jr. (1997–1999)
 Bruno Junqueira (2007–2008)
 Michael Krumm (2001)
 Takuya Kurosawa (2000)
 Buddy Lazier (1991, 1995)
 Katherine Legge (2007)
 Randy Lewis (1991)
 Alex Lloyd (2010–2011)
 André Lotterer (2002)
 Pippa Mann (2013–2018)
 Tarso Marques (2000, 2004–2005)
 Hiro Matsushita (1996)
 Gastón Mazzacane (2004)
 Andrea Montermini (1994)
 Mario Moraes (2008)
 Roberto Moreno (1996–1997)
 Charlie Nearburg (1997)
 John Paul Jr. (1989)
 Gualter Salles (1998–2000, 2003)
 Oriol Servià (2004–2005)
 Tomas Scheckter (2009)
 Alex Sperafico (2003)
 Ricardo Sperafico (2005)
 Brian Till (1994)
 Paul Tracy (1991)
 Johnny Unser (1993–1994)
 Michael Valiante (2005)
 Tristan Vautier (2015, 2017)
 Dennis Vitolo (1991–1993, 1997–1999)
 Andreas Wirth (2006)
 Justin Wilson (2009, 2012–2014)
 Stefan Wilson (2013)
 Jeff Wood (1991)
 Alex Yoong (2003)
 Alessandro Zampedri (1994–1995)

References

External links

Dale Coyne Racing Facebook Page
Dale Coyne Racing Twitter Page
IZOD IndyCar Series Team Page

 
Champ Car teams
IndyCar Series teams
American auto racing teams
Indy Lights teams
Auto racing teams established in 1984